Selångersån is a river in Sweden, running through Selånger.

References

Rivers of Västernorrland County